Kunma (Chinese transcription of Dai), known in Wa as Dāoh Mīe ( "source of the Mīe River";) and in Burmese as Hkun Mar, is a town in the Wa Self-Administered Division, Shan State, Myanmar. It is de facto administered by Wa State.

The town has a diverse population of Bamar, Kokang, Panthay and Wa residents.

Administration 
Under the Wa State, Myanmar, the Dāoh Mīe District is subdivided into
 Dāoh Mīe Township,
 Dāoh Saoh Township,
 Man Raix Township,
 Mān Rāi Township,
 Yaong Hlai Township,
 Mgōng Gouih Township,
 Yaong Dīng Township,
 Yaong Dū Township,
 Dongxing (Dōung Sing) Township, and
 Yaong Noung Township
All above names except for Dongxing are in the Wa language.

Under the Tatmadaw, Kunma has town (မြို့) status.

Notable people 
 Bao Youxiang, commander-in-chief of the United Wa State Army

References 

Populated places in Shan State